Kimia Alizadeh Zonouzi (born 10 July 1998) is an Iranian Taekwondo athlete. Alizadeh won a bronze medal in the taekwondo 57 kg weight class at the 2016 Summer Olympics in Rio de Janeiro by defeating Swedish athlete Nikita Glasnović. This made her the first Iranian woman to win a medal at a Summer Olympics. She also won a gold medal in the women's 63-kg class at the Nanjing 2014 Youth Olympic Games. She beat London 2012 and Rio de Janeiro 2016 gold medallist Jade Jones at the 2015 World Championship to win a bronze medal. She also won a silver medal two years later at the 2017 World Taekwondo Championships.

In January 2020, Alizadeh announced that she was leaving Iran permanently for Europe. Explaining her defection, she stated, "I am one of the millions of oppressed women in Iran who they have been playing with for years." She stated she did not intend to compete for Iran in the 2020 Summer Olympics, and expressed desire to compete for her current place of residence, Germany.
Having been licensed to compete in the Tokyo Olympics, she was finally represented by the Refugee Olympic Team.

Early life
Kimia was born in Karaj. Her family are Iranian of Azerbaijani origin. Her father is from Zonuz near Tabriz and her mother is from Ardabil. Until after the 2016 Olympics, her last name was incorrectly recorded as Zenoorin.

Taekwondo career
Alizadeh at 18 years of age won a bronze medal in the taekwondo 57 kg weight class at the 2016 Summer Olympics in Rio de Janeiro by defeating Swedish athlete Nikita Glasnović. Her victory made her the first Iranian woman to win a medal at a Summer Olympics.

She also won a gold medal in the women's 63-kg class at the Nanjing 2014 Youth Olympics. She beat London 2012 and Rio de Janeiro 2016 gold medallist Jade Jones at the 2015 World Championship to win a bronze medal. She also won a silver medal two years later at the 2017 World Taekwondo Championships.

She was listed in 100 inspiring and influential women from around the world for 2019 by BBC.

During the 2020 Summer Olympics, Alizadeh represented the Refugee Olympic Team, defeating Iranian athlete Nahid Kiani and pulling an upset against number one ranked Jade Jones before losing out on a bronze medal.

Defection
On 10 January 2020, Alizadeh announced she was defecting and leaving her birth country, with searing criticism of the regime of Iran. She did not compete for Iran in the 2020 Summer Olympics, and considered competing for Germany, but ultimately competed on the refugee team.

She wrote an Instagram post explaining she was defecting because of constraint of women in Iran, calling herself "one of the millions of oppressed women in Iran who [Iran's rulers] have been playing with for years." "They took me wherever they wanted. I wore whatever they said. Every sentence they ordered me to say, I repeated. Whenever they saw fit, they exploited me," she wrote, adding that credit always went to those in charge. She wrote further that she "didn't want to sit at the table of hypocrisy, lies, injustice and flattery" any longer, nor remain complicit with the regime's "corruption and lies."

Abdolkarim Hosseinzadeh, a member of Iran's parliament, accused “incompetent officials” of allowing Iran's “human capital to flee”.

In the months prior to her defection a number of top Iranian sports figures had decided to stop representing — or to physically leave — Iran.  In September 2019, Saeid Mollaei, who practices judo and was world champion, left Iran for Germany  after Iranian officials allegedly pressured him to throw a match to avoid competing against Israelis.  Alireza Firouzja, who was Iran's top-rated chess champion, decided to stop playing for Iran in December 2019 because of Iran's informal ban on competing against Israeli players.

See also 
 List of Iranian defectors

References

External links

Official website

Additional sources
Kimia Alizadeh Zenoorin and Hedaya Wahba lead charge of Muslim women in taekwondo Official website of 2016 Summer Olympics

1998 births
Living people
Iranian female taekwondo practitioners
Taekwondo practitioners at the 2014 Summer Youth Olympics
People from Karaj
Taekwondo practitioners at the 2016 Summer Olympics
Medalists at the 2016 Summer Olympics
Olympic bronze medalists for Iran
Iranian Azerbaijanis
Iranian emigrants to Germany
Sportspeople of Iranian descent
Olympic taekwondo practitioners of Iran
Olympic medalists in taekwondo
World Taekwondo Championships medalists
BBC 100 Women
Defecting sportspeople of the Islamic Republic of Iran
Youth Olympic gold medalists for Iran
Asian Taekwondo Championships medalists
Taekwondo practitioners at the 2020 Summer Olympics
Refugee Olympic Team at the 2020 Summer Olympics
21st-century Iranian women